The Durban South Africa Temple is a temple of the Church of Jesus Christ of Latter-day Saints (LDS Church) in Durban, South Africa. The intent to construct the temple was announced by church president Thomas S. Monson on 1 October 2011. The temple was announced concurrently with the Barranquilla Colombia, Kinshasa Democratic Republic of the Congo, Star Valley Wyoming, and Provo City Center temples. When announced, this increased the total number of temples worldwide to 166 and the number in South Africa to two.

A groundbreaking ceremony, to signify the beginning of construction, took place on 9 April 2016, with Carl B. Cook presiding. On 18 June 2019, the LDS Church announced that a public open house is scheduled to be held from 22 January through 1 February 2020, excluding Sunday. The temple was dedicated on 16 February 2020 by Ronald A. Rasband.

In March 2020, along with all the church's other temples, it was closed in response to the coronavirus pandemic.

See also

 List of temples of The Church of Jesus Christ of Latter-day Saints
 List of temples of The Church of Jesus Christ of Latter-day Saints by geographic region
 Comparison of temples of The Church of Jesus Christ of Latter-day Saints
 Temple architecture (Latter-day Saints)
 The Church of Jesus Christ of Latter-day Saints in South Africa

References

External links
Durban South Africa Temple Official site
Durban South Africa Temple at ChurchofJesusChristTemples.org

21st-century Latter Day Saint temples
Buildings and structures in Durban
Religious buildings and structures completed in 2020
Temples (LDS Church) in Africa
Temples in South Africa
The Church of Jesus Christ of Latter-day Saints in South Africa
Proposed buildings and structures in South Africa
21st-century religious buildings and structures in South Africa